Edward Ayscu, Ayscough or Askew (1550–1616/17), was an English historian.

Ayscu was educated at Christ's College, Cambridge, where he graduated B.A. in 1586-1587. He afterward resided at Cotham, in Lincolnshire, from which place he dates the preface to his only work, London, 1607, 4to.

Ayscu has sometimes been confused with his cousin Sir Edward Ayscu (1596–1654?) of South Kelsey.

References

17th-century English historians
17th-century English writers
17th-century English male writers
Alumni of Christ's College, Cambridge
1550 births
1617 deaths
Year of death uncertain